Ali Salman was an Iraqi sprinter. He competed in the men's 100 metres and the men's 200 metres at the 1948 Summer Olympics. He also represented Iraq in the basketball tournament at the same Olympics.

References

External links
 

Year of birth missing
Possibly living people
Athletes (track and field) at the 1948 Summer Olympics
Basketball players at the 1948 Summer Olympics
Iraqi male sprinters
Iraqi men's basketball players
Olympic athletes of Iraq
Olympic basketball players of Iraq
Place of birth missing